This is a list of National Collegiate Athletic Association (NCAA) Division I schools that have never sponsored gridiron football as a varsity sport.

Sprint football, a weight-restricted variant of the sport, has never been overseen by any major national college sports governing body. Schools that have only fielded sprint football teams are considered "non-football" by the NCAA.

Notes

See also
List of NCAA Division I non-football programs
List of defunct college football teams
List of defunct men's college ice hockey teams
List of defunct college basketball teams
List of NCAA institutions with club football teams

References 

College football-related lists
Never sponsored football